The 2006 Grand Prix of Denver was the tenth round of the 2006 Bridgestone Presents the Champ Car World Series Powered by Ford season, held on August 13, 2006 on the streets of Denver, Colorado.  Sébastien Bourdais took the pole while the race was won by A. J. Allmendinger.  Bourdais' race ended when he and Paul Tracy crashed in the final turn of the final lap of the race as Tracy attempted to pass Bourdais to take second place.  Tracy and Bourdais got into a confrontation outside their cars (pictured).  Tracy was subsequently fined and penalized three championship points for avoidable contact for the incident.

Qualifying results

Race

* Paul Tracy, who was already on probation for an incident and fight with Alex Tagliani at the prior race in San Jose, was penalized 3 points and fined $25,000 for avoidable contact for his part in a final lap accident with Sébastien Bourdais. His probation was extended to include the Surfer's Paradise event. Bourdais was not assessed a penalty.

Caution flags

Notes

 New Track Record Sébastien Bourdais 59.096 (Qualification Session #2)
 New Race Lap Record Sébastien Bourdais 1:00.314
 New Race Record A. J. Allmendinger 1:44:59.557
 Average Speed 91.852 mph

Championship standings after the race

Drivers' Championship standings

 Note: Only the top five positions are included.

References

External links
 Friday Qualifying Results 
 Saturday Qualifying Results 
 Race Results
 Tracy Penalized 

Denver
Grand Prix of Denver
Centrix Financial Grand Prix of Denver